The 2015 S.League season is Geylang International's 20th season in the top flight of Singapore football and 40th year in existence as a football club. The club will also compete in the Kata Group Hotel Challenge Cup, Singapore League Cup and the Singapore Cup.

Squad

Coaching staff

Pre-Season Transfers

In

Out

Pre-season Friendlies

Kata Group Hotel Challenge Cup 2015

Club Friendlies

S.League

Round 1

Round 2

Round 3

Singapore League Cup

Singapore Cup

Team statistics

Appearances

Numbers in parentheses denote appearances as substitute.

Goalscorers

Disciplinary record

Awards

Eagles Player of the Month Award

References

Singaporean football clubs 2015 season
Geylang International FC seasons